The badminton mixed doubles tournament at the 2002 Asian Games in Busan took place from 10 November to 13 November at Gangseo Gymnasium.

15 teams from 8 nations entered for the tournament and the Korean duo of Ra Kyung-min and Kim Dong-moon won the gold in this tournament. with a two-set victory over Thailand's Khunakorn Sudhisodhi and Saralee Thungthongkam. China and Indonesia shared the bronze medal.

Schedule
All times are Korea Standard Time (UTC+09:00)

Results

References
2002 Asian Games Official Report, Pages 272

External links
 2002 Asian Games Official Website

Mixed doubles